Maalhos (Dhivehi: މާޅޮސް) is one of the inhabited islands of Ari Atoll, belonging to the Alif Alif Atoll administrative division.

Geography
Maalhos is the westernmost island of Ari Atoll.

Demography

See also
List of lighthouses in the Maldives

References

Islands of the Maldives
Lighthouses in the Maldives